DHK Latgale was a Latvian hockey league team based in Daugavpils, Latvia from 2003 to 2012. The team played in the Latvian Hockey Higher League and in the Belarusian Extraleague for the 2008-09 season.

Notable players
  Robert Machalek (Defender)
  Andrejs Lavrenovs (Defender)
  Mikhail Shibanov (Goalie)
  Lukáš Pék (Forward)
  Donatas Kumeliauskas (Forward)

External links
 HK Latgale official web site

Ice hockey clubs established in 2003
Latvian Hockey League teams
Ice hockey teams in Latvia
Belarusian Extraleague teams
2003 establishments in Latvia
Ice hockey clubs disestablished in 2012
2012 disestablishments in Latvia